The 64th Annual Grammy Awards ceremony was held at the MGM Grand Garden Arena in Las Vegas on April 3, 2022. It recognized the best recordings, compositions, and artists of the eligibility year, running from September 1, 2020, to September 30, 2021. The nominations were revealed via a virtual livestream on November 23, 2021. The performers for the ceremony were announced on March 15, 24, and 30, 2022. South African comedian Trevor Noah, who hosted the previous ceremony in 2021, returned as host. The ceremony's location marked the first time the Recording Academy switched host cities for a single ceremony. This also makes it the first Grammy Awards ceremony to not to be held in either New York City or Los Angeles since the 15th Grammy Awards in 1973 when it was held at the Tennessee Theatre in Nashville, Tennessee.

Jon Batiste received the most nominations with eleven, followed by Doja Cat, H.E.R., and Justin Bieber with eight each. Batiste received the most awards with five, and won Album of the Year for We Are. Silk Sonic won Record of the Year and Song of the Year for "Leave the Door Open", and Olivia Rodrigo won Best New Artist. The ceremony was originally scheduled for January 31, 2022, at the Crypto.com Arena in Los Angeles; however, on January 5, 2022, the Recording Academy postponed the ceremony indefinitely due to health and safety concerns related to the COVID-19 Omicron variant. On January 18, 2022, the ceremony was rescheduled to April 3, 2022, and its location was moved to the MGM Grand Garden Arena in Las Vegas, due to resultant scheduling conflicts with the Crypto.com Arena.

Background
The nominations were announced during a virtual livestream on November 23, 2021, by Recording Academy CEO Harvey Mason Jr., alongside Jon Batiste, Billie Eilish, Finneas O'Connell, H.E.R., BTS, Måneskin, Tayla Parx, Carly Pearce, comedian Nate Bargatze, Recording Academy chair Tammy Hurt, and CBS Mornings anchor Gayle King. The academy announced Trevor Noah to return as the host of the ceremony.

Category changes
For the 2022 ceremony, the academy announced several changes for different categories and rules:
For the General Field, the number of nominees in each category was increased from eight to ten
Package Field, Notes Field, and Historical Field were renamed and consolidated to Package, Notes & Historical Field
Production, Non-Classical Field; Production, Immersive Field; and Production, Classical Field were renamed and consolidated to Production Field
Two categories, Best Global Music Performance and Best Música Urbana Album, were added, bringing the total number of categories to 86
Best Dance Recording was renamed Best Dance/Electronic Recording
For Album of the Year, all credited artists (including those featured), "songwriters of new material, producers, recording engineers, mixers, and mastering engineers are eligible" to be nominated and win the category as recipients
For Classical Field, singles became eligible for Best Orchestral Performance, Best Choral Performance, Best Chamber Music/Small Ensemble Performance, Best Classical Instrumental Solo, and Best Contemporary Classical Composition
For Best Compilation Soundtrack for Visual Media, the following rules were updated:
For albums consisting of pre-existing masters, up to two producers and two music supervisors will be nominated and/or awarded
For albums consisting of new recordings and principal artists with significant performances, up to three producers (or four in extraordinary circumstances) and two music supervisors will be nominated and/or awarded along with an engineer/mixer "who contributes greater than 50% playing time of newly recorded material"
For Music Film Field, music-related documentaries must contain at least 51% of "performance-based material or individual music videos that together create a visual album" while "films with fictional elements are eligible"
Another Technical Grammy Award was added and will be awarded to individuals who "dramatically pushed boundaries and made groundbreaking, important, outstanding, and influential contributions of technical excellence and innovation to the recording field"

Nomination changes
For the 2022 ceremony, the Recording Academy opted to eliminate its nomination review committees, which were previously responsible for determining the nominees of each category. Nominees would be solely decided based on votes from the Recording Academy.

Voting changes
For the 2022 ceremony and during both voting rounds, the number of categories members of the Recording Academy were allowed to vote in was reduced to ten, on top of the four major categories. The ten categories could belong to up to three different fields, including the genre fields. The changes were made to "help ensure the quality of voting".

Nomination withdrawals
Drake was initially announced as a nominee for Best Rap Performance (for "Way 2 Sexy") and Best Rap Album (for Certified Lover Boy), but withdrew from contention for both awards on December 6, 2021. The Recording Academy subsequently honored Drake's request and officially removed his nominations for both awards.

Postponement and relocation
The ceremony was originally scheduled to be held on January 31, 2022, at the Crypto.com Arena in Los Angeles. On January 5, 2022, the Recording Academy postponed the ceremony indefinitely due to health and safety concerns related to the COVID-19 Omicron variant. With the Crypto.com Arena booked with sports games and concerts nearly every night through mid-April, the academy decided to switch the ceremony's location to the MGM Grand Garden Arena in Las Vegas. The MGM Grand Garden Arena hosted the Latin Grammy Awards for six years, including the 22nd Annual Latin Grammy Awards in November 2021.

Performers

Premiere ceremony
The performers for the ceremony were announced on March 25, 2022.

Main ceremony
The performers for the ceremony were announced on March 15, 24, and 30, 2022.
{| class="wikitable plainrowheaders"
|+ List of performers at the 64th Annual Grammy Awards
|-
! scope="col"| Artist(s)
! scope="col"| Song(s)
|-
! scope="row"| Silk Sonic(Bruno Mars and Anderson .Paak)
| "777"  "Hot Music"

|-
! scope="row"| Olivia Rodrigo
| "Drivers License"
|-
! scope="row"| J Balvin
| "Qué Más Pues?" "In da Getto"
|-
! scope="row"| BTS
| "Butter"
|-
! scope="row"| Aymée Nuviola
| "La Gota Fría"
|-
! scope="row"| Lil Nas X
| Medley:"Dead Right Now""Montero (Call Me by Your Name)""Industry Baby" 
|-
! scope="row"| Billie Eilish
| "Happier Than Ever"
|-
! scope="row"| Brandi Carlile
| "Right on Time"
|-
! scope="row"| Nas
| Medley:"I Can""Made You Look""One Mic""Rare"
|-
! scope="row"| Chris Stapleton
| "Cold"
|-
! scope="row"| Maverick City Music
| "Jireh"
|-
! scope="row"| John LegendSiuzanna IglidanMika NewtonLyuba Yakimchuk
| Tribute to Ukraine:  "Free"
|-
! scope="row"| Lady Gaga
| Tribute to Tony Bennett:"Love for Sale""Do I Love You?"
|-
! scope="row"| Billy Strings
| "Hide and Seek"
|-
! scope="row"| Cynthia ErivoBen PlattLeslie Odom Jr.Rachel Zegler
| In Memoriam Segment:"Not a Day Goes By""Send in the Clowns""Somewhere"
|-
! scope="row"| Jon Batiste
| "Freedom"
|-
! scope="row"| Justin BieberGiveonDaniel Caesar
| "Peaches"
|-
! scope="row"| H.E.R.
| "Damage" "We Made It""Are You Gonna Go My Way" 
|-
! scope="row"| Carrie Underwood
| "Ghost Story"
|-
! scope="row"| Brothers Osborne
| "Dead Man's Curve"
|}

Foo Fighters were announced as a performer on March 24, one day before the death of their drummer Taylor Hawkins. The band canceled their performance at the ceremony on March 31. A tribute montage dedicated to Hawkins and set to "My Hero" was aired during the ceremony before the in memoriam segment.

PresentersPremiere ceremony LeVar Burton – host
 Sylvan Esso
 Arlo Parks
 Nnenna and Pierce Freelon
 Jimmie Allen
 Nate Bargatze
 Jimmy JamMain ceremony Questlove – presented Song of the Year
 Anthony Mackie and Kelsea Ballerini – presented Best Country Album
 Dua Lipa and Megan Thee Stallion – presented Best New Artist
 Bonnie Raitt and Joni Mitchell – introduced Brandi Carlile
 Ludacris – presented Best Rap Performance
 Volodymyr Zelenskyy – introduced John Legend, Siuzanna Iglidan, Mika Newton and Lyuba Yakimchuk 
 Tony Bennett – introduced Lady Gaga
 Billy Porter – presented Best R&B Album
 Jared Leto – presented Best Pop Vocal Album
 Avril Lavigne – presented Best Pop Duo/Group Performance
 Keith Urban – presented Record of the Year
 Lenny Kravitz – presented Album of the Year

Winners and nominees
Winners appear first and highlighted in bold.

General fieldRecord of the Year "Leave the Door Open" – Silk Sonic Dernst "D'Mile" Emile II and Bruno Mars, producers; Şerban Ghenea, John Hanes and Charles Moniz, engineers/mixers; Randy Merrill, mastering engineer "I Still Have Faith in You" – ABBA
 Benny Andersson and Björn Ulvaeus, producers; Benny Andersson and Bernard Löhr, engineers/mixers; Björn Engelmann, mastering engineer
 "Freedom" – Jon Batiste
 Jon Batiste, Kizzo and Autumn Rowe, producers; Russ Elevado, Kizzo and Manny Marroquin, engineers/mixers; Michelle Mancini, mastering engineer
 "I Get a Kick Out of You" – Tony Bennett and Lady Gaga
 Dae Bennett, producer; Dae Bennett and Josh Coleman, engineers/mixers; Greg Calbi and Steve Fallone, mastering engineers
 "Peaches" – Justin Bieber featuring Daniel Caesar and Giveon  
 Josh Gudwin, Harv, Shndō and Andrew Watt producers; Josh Gudwin and Andrew Watt, engineers/mixers; Colin Leonard, mastering engineer
 "Right on Time" – Brandi Carlile
 Dave Cobb and Shooter Jennings, producers; Brandon Bell and Tom Elmhirst, engineers/mixers; Pete Lyman, mastering engineer
 "Kiss Me More" – Doja Cat featuring SZA
 Rogét Chahayed, tizhimself and Yeti Beats, producers; Rob Bisel, Şerban Ghenea, Rian Lewis and Joe Visciano, engineers/mixers; Mike Bozzi, mastering engineer
 "Happier Than Ever" – Billie Eilish
 Finneas O'Connell, producer; Billie Eilish, O'Connell and Rob Kinelski, engineers/mixers; Dave Kutch, mastering engineer
 "Montero (Call Me by Your Name)" – Lil Nas X
 Omer Fedi, Roy Lenzo and Take a Daytrip, producers; Denzel Baptiste, Şerban Ghenea and Roy Lenzo, engineers/mixers; Chris Gehringer, mastering engineer
 "Drivers License" – Olivia Rodrigo
 Daniel Nigro, producer; Mitch McCarthy and Nigro, engineers/mixers; Randy Merrill, mastering engineerAlbum of the Year We Are – Jon Batiste Craig Adams, David Gauthier, Braedon Gautier, Brennon Gautier, Gospel Soul Children Choir, Hot 8 Brass Band, PJ Morton, Autumn Rowe, Zadie Smith, St. Augustine High School Marching 100 and Trombone Shorty, featured artists; Jon Batiste, Mikey Freedom Hart, King Garbage, Kizzo, Sunny Levine, Nate Mercereau, David Pimentel, Ricky Reed, Autumn Rowe, Jahaan Sweet and Nick Waterhouse, producers; Batiste, Russ Elevado, Mischa Kachkachishvili, Kizzo, Joseph Lorge, Manny Marroquin, Pimentel, Reed, Jaclyn Sanchez, Matt Vertere, Marc Whitmore and Alex Williams, engineers/mixers; Andrae Alexander, Troy Andrews, Batiste, Zach Cooper, Vic Dimotsis, Eric Frederic, Kizzo, Levine, Steve McEwan, Morton, Rowe and Mavis Staples, songwriters; Michelle Mancini, mastering engineer Love for Sale - Tony Bennett and Lady Gaga
 Dae Bennett, producer; Bennett, Josh Coleman and Billy Cumella, engineers/mixers; Greg Calbi and Steve Fallone, mastering engineers
 Justice (Triple Chucks Deluxe) – Justin Bieber
 Beam, Benny Blanco, Burna Boy, Daniel Caesar, Chance the Rapper, DaBaby, Dominic Fike, Giveon, Jaden, Tori Kelly, Khalid, the Kid Laroi, Lil Uzi Vert and Quavo, featured artists; Amy Allen, Louis Bell, Jon Bellion, Bieber, Blanco, BMW Kenny, Capi, Dreamlab, DVLP, Jason Evigan, Finneas, the Futuristics, German, Josh Gudwin, Jimmie Gutch, Harv, Marvin "Tony" Hemmings, Ilya, Rodney "Darkchild" Jerkins, Stefan Johnson, KCdaproducer, Denis Kosiak, the Monsters & Strangerz, Jorgen Odegard, Michael Pollack, Poo Bear, Shndo, Skrillex, Jake Torrey, Trackz, Andrew Watt and Ido Zmishlany, producers; Cory Bice, Blanco, Kevin "Capi" Carbo, Edwin Diaz, DJ Durel, Dreamlab, Finneas, Josh Gudwin, Sam Holland, Daniel James, Antonio Kearney, Denis Kosiak, Paul LaMalfa, Jeremy Lertola, Devin Nakao, Chris "Tek" O'Ryan, Andres Osorio, Micah Pettit and Benjamin Thomas, engineers/mixers; Allen, Delacey (Brittany Amaradio), Bell, Jonathan Bellion, Chancellor Johnathon Bennett, Bieber, David Bowden, Jason Boyd, Scott Braun, Tommy Lee Brown, Valentin Brunn, Kevin Carbo, Kenneth Coby, Kevin Coby, Raul Cubina, Jordan Douglas, Giveon Dezmann Evans, Jason Evigan, Dominic David Fike, Kameron Glasper, Jacob Greenspan, Josh Gudwin, James Gutch, Scott Harris, Bernard Harvey, Leah Haywood, Gregory Aldae Hein, Marvin Hemmings, Jeffrey Howard, Alexander Izquierdo, Daniel James, Jace Logan Jennings, Rodney Jerkins, Jordan K. Johnson, Stefan Johnson, Anthony M. Jones, Antonio Kearney, Charlton Kenneth, Joe Khajadourian, Felisha "Fury" King, Jonathan Lyndale Kirk, Matthew Sean Leon, Benjamin Levin, Marcus Lomax, Quavious Keyate Marshall, Luis Manuel Martinez Jr., Sonny Moore, Finneas O’Connell, Jorgen Odegard, Damini Ebunoluwa Ogulu, Tayla Parx, Oliver Peterhof, Whitney Phillips, Michael Pollack, Khalid Donnel Robinson, Ilya Salmanzadeh, Alex Schwartz, Tia Scola, Aaron Simmonds, Ashton Simmonds, Gian Stone, Ali Tamposi, Ryan Tedder, Tyshane Thompson, Jake Torrey, Billy Walsh, Freddy Wexler, Symere Woods, Andrew Wotman, Rami Yacoub, Keavan Yazdani, Bigram Zayas and Ido Zmishlany, songwriters; Colin Leonard, mastering engineer
 Planet Her (Deluxe) – Doja Cat
 Eve, Ariana Grande, Gunna, JID, SZA, the Weeknd and Young Thug, featured artists; Aaron Bow, Rogét Chahayed, Crate Classics, Digi, Dr. Luke, Fallen, Mayer Hawthorne, Mike Hector, Linden Jay, Aynzli Jones, Kurtis McKenzie, Jason Quenneville, Reef, Khaled Rohaim, Al Shux, Sully, tizhimself, Yeti Beats and Y2K, producers; Rob Bisel, Jesse Ray Ernster, Şerban Ghenea, Clint Gibbs, Rian Lewis, NealHPogue, Tyler Sheppard, Kalani Thompson, Joe Visciano and Jeff Ellis Worldwide, engineers/mixers; Ilana Armida, Aaron Bow, Rogét Chahayed, Jamil Chammas, Sheldon Yu-Ting Cheung, Antwoine Collins, Amala Zandile Dlamini, Lukasz Gottwald, Ariana Grande, Mayer Hawthorne, Mike Hector, Aaron Horn, Taneisha Damielle Jackson, Linden Jay, Eve Jihan Jeffers, Aynzli Jones, Sergio Kitchens, Carter Lang, Siddharth Mallick, Maciej Margol-Gromada, Kurtis McKenzie, Jidenna Mobisson, Gerard A. Powell II, Geordan Reid-Campbell, Khaled Rohaim, Destin Route, Solána Rowe, Laura Roy, Al Shuckburgh, David Sprecher, Ari Starace, Lee Stashenko, Abel Tesfaye, Rob Tewlow and Jeffery Lamar Williams, songwriters; Dale Becker and Mike Bozzi, mastering engineers
 Happier Than Ever - Billie Eilish
 Finneas, producer; Billie Eilish, Finneas and Rob Kinelski, engineers/mixers; Eilish and Finneas, songwriters; John Greenham and Dave Kutch, mastering engineers
 Back of My Mind - H.E.R.
 Chris Brown, Cordae, DJ Khaled, Lil Baby, Thundercat, Bryson Tiller, Ty Dolla Sign, YG and Yung Bleu, featured artists; Tarik Azzouz, Bordeaux, Nelson Bridges, DJ Camper, Cardiak, Cardo, Chi Chi, Steven J. Collins, Flip, Jeff "Gitty" Gitelman, Grades, H.E.R., Hit-Boy, Rodney "Darkchild" Jerkins, Walter Jones, Kaytranada, DJ Khaled, Mario Luciano, Mike Will Made-It, NonNative, Nova Wav, Scribz Riley, Jeff Robinson, Streetrunner, Hue Strother, Asa Taccone, Thundercat, Thurdi and Wu10, producers; Rafael Fai Bautista, Luis Bordeaux, Dee Brown, Anthony Cruz, Ayanna Depas, Morning Estrada, Chris Galland, H.E.R., Jaycen Joshua, Kaytranada, Derek Keota, Omar Loya, Manny Marroquin, Tim McClain, Juan "AyoJuan" Peña, Micah Petit, Patrizio Pigliapoco, Alex Pyle, Jaclyn Sanchez, Miki Tsutsumi and Tito "Earcandy" Vasquez, engineers/mixers; Denisia "Blu June" Andrews, Nasri Atweh, Tarik Azzouz, Stacy Barthe, Jeremy Biddle, Nelson "Keyz" Bridges, Chris Brown, Stephen Bruner, Darhyl Camper Jr., Luis Campozano, Louis Kevin Celestin, Anthony Clemons Jr., Steven J. Collins, Ronald "Flip" Colson, Brittany "Chi" Coney, Elijah Dias, Cordae Dunston, Jeff Gitelman, Tyrone Griffin Jr., Priscilla "Priscilla Renea" Hamilton, H.E.R., Charles A. Hinshaw, Chauncey Hollis, Latisha Twana Hyman, Keenon Daequan Ray Jackson, Rodney Jerkins, Dominique Jones, Khaled Khaled, Ron Latour, Gamal "Lunchmoney" Lewis, Mario Luciano, Carl McCormick, Leon McQuay III, Julia Michaels, Maxx Moore, Vurdell "V. Script" Muller, Chidi Osondu, Karriem Riggins, Mike "Scribz" Riley, Seandrea Sledge, Hue Strother, Asa Taccone, Tiara Thomas, Bryson Tiller, Daniel James Traynor, Brendan Walsh, Nicholas Warwar, Jabrile Hashim Williams, Michael L. Williams II, Robert Williams and Kelvin Wooten, songwriters; Dave Kutch and Colin Leonard, mastering engineers
 Montero – Lil Nas X
 Miley Cyrus, Doja Cat, Jack Harlow, Elton John and Megan Thee Stallion, featured artists; Take a Daytrip, John Cunningham, Omer Fedi, Kuk Harrell, Jasper Harris, KBeaZy, Carter Lang, Nick Lee, Roy Lenzo, Tom Levesque, Jasper Sheff, Blake Slatkin, Drew Sliger, Take a Daytrip, Ryan Tedder and Kanye West, producers; Denzel Baptiste, David Biral, Jon Castelli, John Cunningham, Jelli Dorman, Tom Elmhirst, Şerban Ghenea, Kuk Harrell, Roy Lenzo, Manny Marroquin, Nickie Jon Pabon, Patrizio 'Teezio' Pigliapoco, Blake Slatkin, Drew Sliger, Ryan Tedder and Joe Visciano, engineers/mixers; Keegan Bach, Denzel Baptiste, David Biral, John Cunningham, Miley Cyrus, Amala Zandile Dlamini, Omer Fedi, Vincent Goodyer, Jack Harlow, Jasper Harris, Montero Hill, Isley Juber, Carter Lang, Nick Lee, Roy Lenzo, Thomas James Levesque, Andrew Luce, Michael Olmo, Jasper Sheff, Blake Slatkin, Ryan Tedder, William K. Ward and Kanye West, songwriters; Chris Gehringer, Eric Lagg and Randy Merrill, mastering engineers
 Sour – Olivia Rodrigo
 Alexander 23, Daniel Nigro and Olivia Rodrigo, producers; Ryan Linvill, Mitch McCarthy and Daniel Nigro, engineers/mixers; Daniel Nigro, Olivia Rodrigo and Casey Smith, songwriters; Randy Merrill, mastering engineer
 Evermore – Taylor Swift
 Bon Iver, Haim and the National, featured artists; Jack Antonoff, Aaron Dessner, Bryce Dessner and Taylor Swift, producers; Thomas Bartlett, JT Bates, Robin Baynton, Stuart Bogie, Gabriel Cabezas, CJ Camerieri, Aaron Dessner, Bryce Dessner, Scott Devendorf, Matt DiMona, Jon Gautier, Trevor Hagen, Mikey Freedom Hart, Sean Hutchinson, Josh Kaufman, Benjamin Lanz, Nick Lloyd, Jonathan Low, James McAlister, Dave Nelson, Sean O'Brien, Ryan Olson, Ariel Rechtshaid, Kyle Resnick, Laura Sisk, Evan Smith, Alex Sopp and Justin Vernon, engineers/mixers; Jack Antonoff, William Bowery, Aaron Dessner, Bryce Dessner, Taylor Swift and Justin Vernon, songwriters; Greg Calbi and Steve Fallone, mastering engineers
 Donda – Kanye West
 Baby Keem, Chris Brown, Conway the Machine, DaBaby, Jay Electronica, Fivio Foreign, Westside Gunn, JAY-Z, Syleena Johnson, Kid Cudi, Lil Baby, Lil Durk, Lil Yachty, the Lox, Marilyn Manson, Playboi Carti, Pop Smoke, Roddy Ricch, Rooga, Travis Scott, Shenseea, Swizz Beatz, Young Thug, Don Toliver, Ty Dolla Sign, Vory and the Weeknd, featured artists; Allday, Audi, AyoAA, Roark Bailey, Louis Bell, Jeff Bhasker, Boi-1da, BoogzDaBeast, Warryn Campbell, Cubeatz, David & Eli, Mike Dean, Dem Jointz, Digital Nas, DJ Khalil, DrtWrk, 88-Keys, E*vax, FnZ, Gesaffelstein, Nikki Grier, Cory Henry, Ronny J, DJ Khalil, Wallis Lane, Digital Nas, Nascent, Ojivolta, Shuko, Sloane, Sean Solymar, Sucuki, Arron "Arrow" Sunday, Swizz Beatz, Zen Tachi, 30 Roc, Bastian Völkel, Mia Wallis, Kanye West, Wheezy and Jason White, producers; Josh Berg, Todd Bergman, Rashade Benani Bevel Sr., Will Chason, Dem Jointz, Irko, Jess Jackson, Nagaris Johnson, Shin Kamiyama, Gimel "Young Guru" Keaton, James Kelso, Scott McDowell, Kalam Ali Muttalib, Jonathan Pfarr, Jonathan Pfzar, Drrique Rendeer, Alejandro Rodriguez-Dawson, Mikalai Skrobat, Devon Wilson and Lorenzo Wolff, engineers/mixers; Dwayne Abernathy Jr., Elpadaro F. Electronica Allah, Aswad Asif, Roark Bailey, Durk Banks, Sam Barsh, Christoph Bauss, Louis Bell, Jeff Bhasker, Isaac De Boni, Christopher Brown, Jahshua Brown, Tahrence Brown, Aaron Butts, Warryn Campbell, Hykeem Carter Jr., Jordan Terrell Carter, Shawn Carter, Denzel Charles, Raul Cubina, Isaac De Boni, Kasseem Dean, Michael Dean, Tim Friedrich, Wesley Glass, Samuel Gloade, Kevin Gomringer, Tim Gomringer, Tyrone Griffin Jr., Jahmal Gwin, Cory Henry, Tavoris Javon Hollins Jr., Larry Hoover Jr., Bashar Jackson, Sean Jacob, Nima Jahanbin, Paimon Jahanbin, Syleena Johnson, Dominique Armani Jones, Eli Klughammer, Chinsea Lee, Mike Lévy, Evan Mast, Mark Mbogo, Miles McCollum, Josh Mease, Scott Medcudi, Brian Miller, Rodrick Wayne Moore Jr., Michael Mulé, Mark Myrie, Charles M. Njapa, Nasir Pemberton, Carlos St. John Phillips, Jason Phillips, Khalil Abdul Rahman, Laraya Ashlee Robinson, Christopher Ruelas, David Ruoff, Maxie Lee Ryles III, Matthew Samuels, Daniel Seeff, Eric Sloan Jr., Sean Solymar, Ronald O’Neill Spence Jr., David Styles, Michael Suski, Aqeel Tate, Abel Makkonen Tesfaye, Caleb Zackery Toliver, Bastian Völkel, Brian Hugh Warner, Jacques Webster II, Kanye West, Orlando Wilder, Jeffery Williams and Mark Williams, songwriters; Irko, mastering engineerSong of the Year "Leave the Door Open" Brandon Anderson, Christopher Brody Brown, Dernst Emile II and Bruno Mars, songwriters (Silk Sonic) "Bad Habits"
 Fred Gibson, Johnny McDaid and Ed Sheeran, songwriters (Sheeran)
 "A Beautiful Noise"
 Ruby Amanfu, Brandi Carlile, Brandy Clark, Alicia Keys, Hillary Lindsey, Lori McKenna, Linda Perry and Hailey Whitters, songwriters (Keys and Carlile)
 "Drivers License"
 Daniel Nigro and Olivia Rodrigo, songwriters (Rodrigo)
 "Fight for You"
 Dernst Emile II, H.E.R. and Tiara Thomas, songwriters (H.E.R.)
 "Happier Than Ever"
 Billie Eilish and Finneas O'Connell, songwriters (Eilish)
 "Kiss Me More"
 Rogét Chahayed, Amala Zandile Dlamini, Lukasz Gottwald, Carter Lang, Gerard A. Powell II, Solána Rowe and David Sprecher, songwriters (Doja Cat featuring SZA)
 "Montero (Call Me by Your Name)"
 Denzel Baptiste, David Biral, Omer Fedi, Montero Hill and Roy Lenzo, songwriters (Lil Nas X)
 "Peaches"
 Louis Bell, Justin Bieber, Giveon Dezmann Evans, Bernard Harvey, Felisha "Fury" King, Matthew Sean Leon, Luis Manuel Martinez Jr., Aaron Simmonds, Ashton Simmonds, Andrew Wotman and Keavan Yazdani, songwriters (Bieber featuring Daniel Caesar and Giveon)
 "Right on Time"
 Brandi Carlile, Dave Cobb, Phil Hanseroth and Tim Hanseroth, songwriters (Carlile)Best New Artist Olivia Rodrigo Arooj Aftab
 Jimmie Allen
 Baby Keem
 Finneas
 Glass Animals
 Japanese Breakfast
 The Kid Laroi
 Arlo Parks
 Saweetie

PopBest Pop Solo Performance "Drivers License" – Olivia Rodrigo "Anyone" – Justin Bieber
 "Right on Time" – Brandi Carlile
 "Happier Than Ever" – Billie Eilish
 "Positions" – Ariana GrandeBest Pop Duo/Group Performance "Kiss Me More" – Doja Cat featuring SZA "I Get a Kick Out of You" – Tony Bennett and Lady Gaga
 "Lonely" – Justin Bieber and Benny Blanco
 "Butter" – BTS
 "Higher Power" – ColdplayBest Traditional Pop Vocal Album Love for Sale – Tony Bennett and Lady Gaga Til We Meet Again (Live) – Norah Jones
 A Tori Kelly Christmas – Tori Kelly
 Ledisi Sings Nina – Ledisi 
 That's Life – Willie Nelson
 A Holly Dolly Christmas – Dolly PartonBest Pop Vocal Album Sour – Olivia Rodrigo Justice (Triple Chucks Deluxe) – Justin Bieber
 Planet Her (Deluxe) – Doja Cat
 Happier Than Ever – Billie Eilish
 Positions – Ariana Grande

Dance/Electronic musicBest Dance/Electronic Recording "Alive" – Rüfüs Du Sol Jason Evigan and Rüfüs Du Sol, producers; Cassian Stewart-Kasimba, mixer "Hero" – Afrojack and David Guetta
 Afrojack, David Guetta, Kuk Harrell and Stargate, producers; Elio Debets, mixer
 "Loom" – Ólafur Arnalds featuring Bonobo
 Ólafur Arnalds and Simon Green, producers; Ólafur Arnalds, mixer
 "Before" – James Blake
 James Blake and Dom Maker, producers; James Blake, mixer
 "Heartbreak" – Bonobo and Totally Enormous Extinct Dinosaurs
 Simon Green and Orlando Higginbottom, producers; Simon Green and Orlando Higginbottom, mixers
 "You Can Do It" – Caribou
 Dan Snaith, producer; David Wrench, mixer
 "The Business" – Tiësto
 Hightower, Julia Karlsson and Tiësto, producers; Tiësto, mixerBest Dance/Electronic Album Subconsciously – Black Coffee Fallen Embers – Illenium
 Music Is the Weapon (Reloaded) – Major Lazer
 Shockwave – Marshmello
 Free Love – Sylvan Esso
 Judgement – Ten City

Contemporary Instrumental musicBest Contemporary Instrumental Album Tree Falls – Taylor Eigsti Double Dealin – Randy Brecker and Eric Marienthal
 The Garden – Rachel Eckroth
 At Blue Note Tokyo – Steve Gadd Band
 Deep: The Baritone Sessions, Vol. 2 – Mark Lettieri

RockBest Rock Performance "Making a Fire" – Foo Fighters "Shot in the Dark" – AC/DC
 "Know You Better" (Live from Capitol Studio A) – Black Pumas
 "Nothing Compares 2 U" – Chris Cornell
 "Ohms" – DeftonesBest Metal Performance "The Alien" – Dream Theater "Genesis" – Deftones
 "Amazonia" – Gojira
 "Pushing the Tides" – Mastodon
 "The Triumph of King Freak (A Crypt of Preservation and Superstition)" – Rob ZombieBest Rock Song "Waiting on a War" Dave Grohl, Taylor Hawkins, Rami Jaffee, Nate Mendel, Chris Shiflett and Pat Smear, songwriters (Foo Fighters) "All My Favorite Songs" 
 Rivers Cuomo, Ashley Gorley, Ben Johnson and Ilsey Juber, songwriters (Weezer)
 "The Bandit" 
 Caleb Followill, Jared Followill, Matthew Followill and Nathan Followill, songwriters (Kings Of Leon)
 "Distance"
 Wolfgang Van Halen, songwriter (Mammoth WVH)
 "Find My Way"
 Paul McCartney, songwriter (Paul McCartney)Best Rock Album Medicine at Midnight – Foo Fighters Power Up – AC/DC
 Capitol Cuts - Live from Studio A – Black Pumas
 No One Sings Like You Anymore, Vol. 1 – Chris Cornell
 McCartney III – Paul McCartney

AlternativeBest Alternative Music Album Daddy's Home – St. Vincent Shore – Fleet Foxes
 If I Can't Have Love, I Want Power – Halsey
 Jubilee – Japanese Breakfast
 Collapsed in Sunbeams – Arlo Parks

R&BBest R&B Performance "Leave the Door Open" – Silk Sonic (TIE) "Pick Up Your Feelings" – Jazmine Sullivan (TIE) "Lost You" – Snoh Aalegra
 "Peaches" – Justin Bieber featuring Daniel Caesar and Giveon
 "Damage" – H.E.R.Best Traditional R&B Performance "Fight for You" – H.E.R. "I Need You" – Jon Batiste
 "Bring It On Home to Me" – BJ the Chicago Kid, PJ Morton and Kenyon Dixon featuring Charlie Bereal
 "Born Again" – Leon Bridges featuring Robert Glasper
 "How Much Can a Heart Take" – Lucky Daye featuring YebbaBest R&B Song "Leave the Door Open" Brandon Anderson, Christopher Brody Brown, Dernst Emile II and Bruno Mars, songwriters (Silk Sonic) "Damage"
 Anthony Clemons Jr., Jeff Gitelman, H.E.R., Carl McCormick and Tiara Thomas, songwriters (H.E.R.)
 "Good Days"
 Jacob Collier, Carter Lang, Carlos Munoz, Solána Rowe and Christopher Ruelas, songwriters (SZA)
 "Heartbreak Anniversary"
 Giveon Evans, Maneesh, Sevn Thomas and Varren Wade, songwriters (Giveon)
 "Pick Up Your Feelings"
 Denisia "Blue June" Andrews, Audra Mae Butts, Kyle Coleman, Brittany "Chi" Coney, Michael Holmes and Jazmine Sullivan, songwriters (Jazmine Sullivan)Best Progressive R&B Album Table for Two – Lucky Daye New Light – Eric Bellinger
 Something To Say – Cory Henry
 Mood Valiant – Hiatus Kaiyote
 Dinner Party: Dessert – Terrace Martin, Robert Glasper, 9th Wonder and Kamasi Washington
 Studying Abroad: Extended Stay – MasegoBest R&B Album Heaux Tales – Jazmine Sullivan Temporary Highs in the Violet Skies – Snoh Aalegra
 We Are – Jon Batiste
 Gold-Diggers Sound – Leon Bridges
 Back of My Mind – H.E.R.

RapBest Rap Performance 
 "Family Ties" – Baby Keem featuring Kendrick Lamar "Up" – Cardi B
 "My Life" – J. Cole featuring 21 Savage and Morray
 "Thot Shit" – Megan Thee StallionBest Melodic Rap Performance "Hurricane" – Kanye West featuring the Weeknd and Lil Baby "Pride Is the Devil" – J. Cole featuring Lil Baby
 "Need to Know" – Doja Cat
 "Industry Baby" – Lil Nas X featuring Jack Harlow
 "WusYaName" – Tyler, the Creator featuring Youngboy Never Broke Again and Ty Dolla SignBest Rap Song "Jail" Dwayne Abernathy, Jr., Shawn Carter, Raul Cubina, Michael Dean, Charles M. Njapa, Sean Solymar, Kanye West and Mark Williams, songwriters (Kanye West featuring Jay-Z) "Bath Salts"
 Shawn Carter, Kasseem Dean, Michael Forno, Nasir Jones and Earl Simmons, songwriters (DMX featuring Jay-Z and Nas)
 "Best Friend"
 Amala Zandile Dlamini, Lukasz Gottwald, Randall Avery Hammers, Diamonté Harper, Asia Smith, Theron Thomas and Rocco Valdes, songwriters (Saweetie featuring Doja Cat)
 "Family Ties" 
 Roshwita Larisha Bacha, Hykeem Carter, Tobias Dekker, Colin Franken, Jasper Harris, Kendrick Lamar, Ronald Latour and Dominik Patrzek, songwriters (Baby Keem featuring Kendrick Lamar)
 "My Life"
 Shéyaa Bin Abraham-Joseph and Jermaine Cole, songwriters (J. Cole featuring 21 Savage and Morray)Best Rap Album Call Me If You Get Lost – Tyler, the Creator The Off-Season – J. Cole
 King's Disease II – Nas 
 Donda – Kanye West

CountryBest Country Solo Performance	
 "You Should Probably Leave" – Chris Stapleton "Forever After All" – Luke Combs
 "Remember Her Name" – Mickey Guyton
 "All I Do Is Drive" – Jason Isbell
 "Camera Roll" – Kacey MusgravesBest Country Duo/Group Performance "Younger Me" – Brothers Osborne "If I Didn't Love You" – Jason Aldean and Carrie Underwood
 "Glad You Exist" – Dan + Shay
 "Chasing After You" – Ryan Hurd and Maren Morris
 "Drunk (And I Don't Wanna Go Home)" – Elle King and Miranda LambertBest Country Song "Cold" Dave Cobb, J.T. Cure, Derek Mixon and Chris Stapleton, songwriters (Chris Stapleton) "Better Than We Found It" 
 Jessie Jo Dillon, Maren Morris, Jimmy Robbins and Laura Veltz, songwriters (Maren Morris)
 "Camera Roll"
 Ian Fitchuk, Kacey Musgraves and Daniel Tashian, songwriters (Kacey Musgraves)
 "Country Again"
 Zach Crowell, Ashley Gorley and Thomas Rhett, songwriters (Thomas Rhett)
 "Fancy Like"
 Cameron Bartolini, Walker Hayes, Josh Jenkins and Shane Stevens, songwriters (Walker Hayes)
 "Remember Her Name"
 Mickey Guyton, Blake Hubbard, Jarrod Ingram and Parker Welling, songwriters (Mickey Guyton)Best Country Album Starting Over – Chris Stapleton Skeletons – Brothers Osborne
 Remember Her Name – Mickey Guyton
 The Marfa Tapes – Miranda Lambert, Jon Randall and Jack Ingram
 The Ballad of Dood and Juanita – Sturgill Simpson

New AgeBest New Age Album Divine Tides – Stewart Copeland and Ricky Kej Brothers – Will Ackerman, Jeff Oster and Tom Eaton
 Pangaea – Wouter Kellerman and David Arkenstone
 Night + Day – Opium Moon
 Pieces of Forever – Laura Sullivan

JazzBest Improvised Jazz Solo "Humpty Dumpty (Set 2)" – Chick Corea "Sackodougou" – Christian Scott aTunde Adjuah
 "Kick Those Feet" – Kenny Barron
 "Bigger Than Us" – Jon Batiste
 "Absence" – Terence BlanchardBest Jazz Vocal Album Songwrights Apothecary Lab – Esperanza Spalding Generations – The Baylor Project
 SuperBlue – Kurt Elling and Charlie Hunter
 Time Traveler – Nnenna Freelon
 Flor – Gretchen ParlatoBest Jazz Instrumental Album Skyline – Ron Carter, Jack DeJohnette and Gonzalo Rubalcaba Jazz Selections: Music from and Inspired by Soul – Jon Batiste
 Absence – Terence Blanchard featuring the E Collective and the Turtle Island Quartet
 Akoustic Band Live – Chick Corea, John Patitucci and Dave Weckl
 Side-Eye NYC (V1.IV) – Pat MethenyBest Large Jazz Ensemble Album For Jimmy, Wes and Oliver – Christian McBride Big Band Live at Birdland! – The Count Basie Orchestra directed by Scotty Barnhart
 Dear Love – Jazzmeia Horn and her Noble Force
 Swirling – Sun Ra Arkestra
 Jackets XL – Yellowjackets + WDR Big BandBest Latin Jazz Album Mirror Mirror – Eliane Elias with Chick Corea and Chucho Valdés The South Bronx Story – Carlos Henriquez
 Virtual Birdland – Arturo O'Farrill and the Afro Latin Jazz Orchestra
 Transparency – Dafnis Prieto Sextet
 El Arte del Bolero – Miguel Zenón and Luis Perdomo

Gospel/Contemporary Christian musicBest Gospel Performance/Song "Never Lost" – CeCe Winans Chris Brown, Steven Furtick and Tiffany Hammer, songwriters "Voice of God" – Dante Bowe featuring Steffany Gretzinger and Chandler Moore
 Dante Bowe, Tywan Mack, Jeff Schneeweis and Mitch Wong, songwriters
 "Joyful" – Dante Bowe
 Dante Bowe and Ben Schofield, songwriters
 "Help" – Anthony Brown & Group Therapy
 Anthony Brown and Darryl Woodson, songwriters
 "Wait on You" – Elevation Worship and Maverick City Music
 Dante Bowe, Chris Brown, Steven Furtick, Tiffany Hudson, Brandon Lake and Chandler Moore, songwritersBest Contemporary Christian Music Performance/Song "Believe for It" – CeCe Winans Dwan Hill, Kyle Lee, CeCe Winans and Mitch Wong, songwriters "We Win" – Kirk Franklin and Lil Baby
 Kirk Franklin, Dominique Jones, Cynthia Nunn and Justin Smith, songwriters
 "Hold Us Together" (Hope Mix) – H.E.R. and Tauren Wells
 Josiah Bassey, Dernst Emile and H.E.R., songwriters
 "Man of Your Word" – Chandler Moore and KJ Scriven
 Jonathan Jay, Nathan Jess and Chandler Moore, songwriters
 "Jireh" – Elevation Worship and Maverick City Music featuring Chandler Moore and Naomi Raine
 Chris Brown, Steven Furtick, Chandler Moore and Naomi Raine, songwritersBest Gospel Album Believe for It – CeCe Winans Changing Your Story – Jekalyn Carr
 Royalty: Live at the Ryman – Tasha Cobbs Leonard
 Jubilee: Juneteenth Edition – Maverick City Music
 Jonny X Mali: Live in LA – Jonathan McReynolds and Mali MusicBest Contemporary Christian Music Album Old Church Basement – Elevation Worship and Maverick City Music No Stranger – Natalie Grant
 Feels Like Home Vol. 2 – Israel and New Breed
 The Blessing (Live) – Kari Jobe
 Citizen of Heaven (Live) – Tauren WellsBest Roots Gospel Album My Savior – Carrie Underwood Alone with My Faith – Harry Connick Jr.
 That's Gospel, Brother – Gaither Vocal Band
 Keeping On – Ernie Haase & Signature Sound
 Songs for the Times – The Isaacs

LatinBest Latin Pop Album Mendó – Alex Cuba Vértigo – Pablo Alborán
 Mis Amores – Paula Arenas  
 Hecho a la Antigua – Ricardo Arjona 
 Mis Manos – Camilo  
 Revelación – Selena GomezBest Música Urbana Album El Último Tour Del Mundo – Bad Bunny Afrodisíaco – Rauw Alejandro
 Jose – J Balvin
 KG0516 – Karol G
 Sin Miedo (del Amor y Otros Demonios) – Kali UchisBest Latin Rock or Alternative Album Origen – Juanes Deja – Bomba Estéreo
 Mira Lo Que Me Hiciste Hacer (Deluxe Edition) – Diamante Eléctrico
 Calambre – Nathy Peluso
 El Madrileño – C. Tangana
 Sonidos de Karmática Resonancia – ZoéBest Regional Mexican Music Album (Including Tejano) A Mis 80's – Vicente Fernández Antología de la Musica Ranchera, Vol. 2 – Aida Cuevas
 Seis – Mon Laferte
 Un Canto por México, Vol. 2 – Natalia Lafourcade
 AYAYAY! (Súper Deluxe) – Christian NodalBest Tropical Latin Album SALSWING! – Rubén Blades and Roberto Delgado & Orquesta En Cuarentena – El Gran Combo de Puerto Rico
 Sin Salsa No Hay Paraíso – Aymée Nuviola
 Colegas – Gilberto Santa Rosa
 Live in Peru – Tony Succar

American RootsBest American Roots Performance "Cry" – Jon Batiste "Love and Regret" – Billy Strings
 "I Wish I Knew How It Would Feel to Be Free" – The Blind Boys Of Alabama and Béla Fleck
 "Same Devil" – Brandy Clark featuring Brandi Carlile
 "Nightflyer" – Allison RussellBest American Roots Song "Cry" Jon Batiste and Steve McEwan, songwriters (Jon Batiste) "Avalon"
 Rhiannon Giddens, Justin Robinson and Francesco Turrisi, songwriters (Rhiannon Giddens with Francesco Turrisi)
 "Bored"
 Linda Chorney, songwriter (Linda Chorney)
 "Call Me a Fool"
 Valerie June, songwriter (Valerie June featuring Carla Thomas)
 "Diamond Studded Shoes"
 Dan Auerbach, Natalie Hemby, Aaron Lee Tasjan and Yola, songwriters (Yola)
 "Nightflyer"
 Jeremy Lindsay and Allison Russell, songwriters (Allison Russell)Best Americana Album Native Sons – Los Lobos Downhill from Everywhere – Jackson Browne
 Leftover Feelings – John Hiatt with the Jerry Douglas Band
 Outside Child – Allison Russell
 Stand for Myself – YolaBest Bluegrass Album My Bluegrass Heart – Béla Fleck Renewal – Billy Strings
 A Tribute to Bill Monroe – The Infamous Stringdusters
 Cuttin' Grass, Vol. 1: The Butcher Shoppe Sessions – Sturgill Simpson
 Music Is What I See – Rhonda VincentBest Traditional Blues Album I Be Trying – Cedric Burnside 100 Years of Blues – Elvin Bishop and Charlie Musselwhite
 Traveler's Blues – Blues Traveler
 Be Ready When I Call You – Guy Davis
 Take Me Back – Kim WilsonBest Contemporary Blues Album 662 – Christone "Kingfish" Ingram Delta Kream – The Black Keys featuring Eric Deaton and Kenny Brown
 Royal Tea – Joe Bonamassa
 Uncivil War – Shemekia Copeland
 Fire It Up – Steve CropperBest Folk Album They're Calling Me Home – Rhiannon Giddens with Francesco Turrisi One Night Lonely (Live) – Mary Chapin Carpenter
 Long Violent History – Tyler Childers
 Wednesday (Extended Edition) – Madison Cunningham
 Blue Heron Suite – Sarah JaroszBest Regional Roots Music Album Kau Ka Pe'a – Kalani Pe'a Live in New Orleans! – Sean Ardoin and Kreole Rock and Soul
 Bloodstains & Teardrops – Big Chief Monk Boudreaux
 My People – Cha Wa
 Corey Ledet Zydeco – Corey Ledet Zydeco

ReggaeBest Reggae Album Beauty in the Silence – SOJA Pamoja – Etana
 Positive Vibration – Gramps Morgan
 Live N Livin – Sean Paul
 Royal – Jesse Royal
 10 – Spice

Global musicBest Global Music Album 
 Mother Nature – Angélique Kidjo Voice of Bunbon (Vol. 1) – Rocky Dawuni
 East West Players Presents: Daniel Ho & Friends Live in Concert – Daniel Ho & Friends
 Legacy + – Femi Kuti and Made Kuti
 Made in Lagos (Deluxe Edition) – WizkidBest Global Music Performance "Mohabbat" – Arooj Aftab "Do Yourself" – Angélique Kidjo and Burna Boy
 "Pà Pá Pà" – Femi Kuti
 "Blewu" – Yo-Yo Ma and Angélique Kidjo
 "Essence" – Wizkid featuring Tems

Children'sBest Children's Album A Colorful World – Falu Actívate – 123 Andrés
 All One Tribe – 1 Tribe Collective
 Black to the Future – Pierce Freelon
 Crayon Kids – Lucky Diaz and the Family Jam Band

Spoken WordBest Spoken Word Album (Includes Poetry, Audio Books & Storytelling) Carry On: Reflections for a New Generation from John Lewis – Don Cheadle Aftermath – LeVar Burton
 Catching Dreams: Live at Fort Knox Chicago – J. Ivy
 8:46 – Dave Chappelle and Amir Sulaiman
 A Promised Land – Barack Obama

ComedyBest Comedy Album Sincerely Louis CK – Louis C.K. The Comedy Vaccine – Lavell Crawford
 Evolution – Chelsea Handler
 Thanks for Risking Your Life – Lewis Black
 The Greatest Average American – Nate Bargatze
 Zero F***s Given – Kevin Hart

Musical TheaterBest Musical Theater Album The Unofficial Bridgerton Musical – Emily Bear, producer; Abigail Barlow and Emily Bear, composer and lyricist (Barlow and Bear) Andrew Lloyd Webber's Cinderella – Carrie Hope Fletcher, Ivano Turco, Victoria Hamilton-Barritt and Helen George, principal soloists; Andrew Lloyd Webber, Nick Lloyd Webber and Greg Wells, producers; David Zippel and Andrew Lloyd Webber, composers/lyricists
 Burt Bacharach and Steven Sater's Some Lovers – Burt Bacharach, Michael Croiter, Ben Hartman and Steven Sater, producers; Burt Bacharach, composer; Steven Sater, lyricist (World Premier Cast)
 Girl from the North Country – Simon Hale, Conor McPherson, and Dean Sharenow, producers; Bob Dylan, composer/lyricist (Original Broadway Cast)
 Les Misérables: The Staged Concert – Michael Ball, Alfie Boe, Carrie Hope Fletcher and Matt Lucas, principal soloists; Cameron Mackintosh, Lee McCutcheon and Stephen Metcalfe, producers; Claude-Michel Schönberg, composer; Alain Boublil, John Caird, Herbert Kretzmer, Jean-Marc Natel and Trevor Nunn, lyricists (2020 Les Misérables Staged Concert)
 Stephen Schwartz's Snapshots – Damon Daunno, Rebecca Naomi Jones, Ali Stroker, Mary Testa and Patrick Vaill, principal soloists; Daniel C. Levine, Michael J. Moritz Jr., Bryan Perri and Stephen Schwartz, producers; Stephen Schwartz, composer and lyricist (World Premier Cast)

Music for Visual MediaBest Compilation Soundtrack for Visual Media The United States vs. Billie Holiday – Andra Day Salaam Remi, compilation producer; Lynn Fainchtein, music supervisor Cruella – Various artists
 Craig Gillespie, compilation producer; Susan Jacobs, music supervisor
 Dear Evan Hansen – Various artists
 Alex Lacamoire, Benj Pasek, Justin Paul and Dan Romer, compilation producers; Jordan Carroll, music supervisor
 In the Heights – Various artists
 Alex Lacamoire, Lin-Manuel Miranda, Bill Sherman and Greg Wells, compilation producers; Steven Gizicki, music supervisor
 One Night in Miami... – Leslie Odom, Jr. and various artists
 Nicholai Baxter, compilation producer; Randall Poster, music supervisor
 Respect – Jennifer Hudson
 Stephen Bray and Jason Michael Webb, compilation producers
 Schmigadoon! Episode 1 – Various artists
 Doug Besterman, Cinco Paul and Scott M. Riesett, compilation producersBest Score Soundtrack for Visual Media The Queen's Gambit – Carlos Rafael Rivera, composer (TIE) Soul – Jon Batiste, Trent Reznor and Atticus Ross, composers (TIE) Bridgerton – Kris Bowers, composer
 Dune – Hans Zimmer, composer
 The Mandalorian: Season 2 – Vol. 2 (Chapters 13–16) – Ludwig Göransson, composerBest Song Written for Visual Media "All Eyes on Me" (from Bo Burnham: Inside) Bo Burnham (Bo Burnham) "Agatha All Along" (from WandaVision)
 Kristen Anderson-Lopez and Robert Lopez (Kristen Anderson-Lopez and Robert Lopez Featuring Kathryn Hahn, Eric Bradley, Greg Whipple, Jasper Randall and Gerald White)
 "All I Know So Far" (from Pink: All I Know So Far)
 Alecia Moore, Benj Pasek and Justin Paul (Pink)
 "Fight For You" (from Judas and the Black Messiah)
 Dernst Emile II, H.E.R. and Tiara Thomas (H.E.R.)
 "Here I Am (Singing My Way Home)" (from Respect)
 Jamie Hartman, Jennifer Hudson and Carole King (Jennifer Hudson)
 "Speak Now" (from One Night in Miami...)
 Sam Ashworth and Leslie Odom, Jr. (Leslie Odom, Jr.)

Composing/ArrangingBest Instrumental Composition "Eberhard" Lyle Mays, composer (Lyle Mays) "Beautiful Is Black"
 Brandee Younger, composer (Brandee Younger)
 "Cat and Mouse"
 Tom Nazziola, composer (Tom Nazziola)
 "Concerto for Orchestra: Finale"
 Vince Mendoza, composer (Vince Mendoza and Czech National Symphony Orchestra featuring Antonio Sánchez and Derrick Hodge)
 "Dreaming in Lions: Dreaming in Lions"
 Arturo O’Farrill, composer (Arturo O'Farrill and the Afro Latin Jazz Ensemble)Best Arrangement, Instrumental or A Cappella "Meta Knight's Revenge (From Kirby Super Star)" Charlie Rosen and Jake Silverman, arrangers (The 8-Bit Big Band featuring Button Masher) "Chopsticks"
 Bill O'Connell, arranger (Richard Baratta)
 "For the Love of a Princess (From Braveheart)
 Robin Smith, arranger (Hauser, London Symphony Orchestra and Robin Smith)
 "Infinite Love"
 Emile Mosseri, arranger (Emile Mosseri)
 "The Struggle Within"
 Gabriela Quintero and Rodrigo Sanchez, arrangers (Rodrigo y Gabriela)Best Arrangement, Instruments and Vocals "To The Edge of Longing (Edit Version)" Vince Mendoza, arranger (Vince Mendoza, Czech National Symphony Orchestra and Julia Bullock) "The Bottom Line"
 Ólafur Arnalds, arranger (Ólafur Arnalds and Josin)
 "A Change is Gonna Come"
 Tehillah Alphonso, arranger (Tonality and Alexander Lloyd Blake)
 "The Christmas Song (Chestnuts Roasting on an Open Fire)"
 Jacob Collier, arranger (Jacob Collier)
 "Eleanor Rigby"
 Cody Fry, arranger (Cody Fry)

Package, Notes & HistoricalBest Recording Package Pakelang
 Li Jheng Han and Yu Wei, art directors (2nd Generation Falangao Singing Group and the Chairman Crossover Big Band)
 American Jackpot / American Girls
 Sarah Dodds and Shauna Dodds, art directors (Reckless Kelly)
 Carnage
 Nick Cave and Tom Hingston, art directors (Nick Cave and Warren Ellis)
 Serpentine Prison
 Dayle Doyle, art director (Matt Berninger)
 Zeta
 Xiao Qing Yang, art director (Soul of Ears)

Best Boxed or Special Limited Edition Package
 All Things Must Pass: 50th Anniversary Edition
 Darren Evans, Dhani Harrison and Olivia Harrison, art directors (George Harrison)
 Color Theory
 Lordess Foudre and Christopher Leckie, art directors (Soccer Mommy)
 The Future Bites (Limited Edition Box Set)
 Simon Moore and Steven Wilson, art directors (Steven Wilson)
 77-81
 Dan Calderwood and Jon King, art directors (Gang of Four)
 Swimming in Circles
 Ramón Coronado and Marshall Rake, art directors (Mac Miller)

Best Album Notes
 The Complete Louis Armstrong Columbia and RCA Victor Studio Sessions 1946-1966
 Ricky Riccardi, album notes writer (Louis Armstrong)
 Beethoven: The Last Three Sonatas
 Ann-Katrin Zimmermann, album notes writer (Sunwook Kim)
 Creation Never Sleeps, Creation Never Dies: The Willie Dunn Anthology
 Kevin Howes, album notes writer (Willie Dunn)
 Etching The Voice: Emile Berliner and the First Commercial Gramophone Discs, 1889-1895
 David Giovannoni, Richard Martin and Stephan Puille, album notes writers (Various Artists)
 The King of Gospel Music: The Life and Music of Reverend James Cleveland
 Robert Marovich, album notes writer (Various Artists)

Best Historical Album
 Joni Mitchell Archives – Vol. 1: The Early Years (1963–1967)
 Patrick Milligan and Joni Mitchell, compilation producers; Bernie Grundman, mastering engineer (Joni Mitchell)
 Beyond The Music: Her Complete RCA Victor Recordings
 Robert Russ, compilation producer; Nancy Conforti, Andreas K. Meyer and Jennifer Nulsen, mastering engineers (Marian Anderson)
 Etching The Voice: Emile Berliner and the First Commercial Gramophone Discs, 1889-1895
 Meagan Hennessey and Richard Martin, compilation producers; Richard Martin, mastering engineer (Various Artists)
 Excavated Shellac: An Alternate History of the World's Music
 April Ledbetter, Steven Lance Ledbetter and Jonathan Ward, compilation producers; Michael Graves, mastering engineer (Various Artists)
 Sign O' The Times (Super Deluxe Edition)
 Trevor Guy, Michael Howe and Kirk Johnson, compilation producers; Bernie Grundman, mastering engineer (Prince)

Production
Best Engineered Album, Non-Classical
 Love for Sale
 Dae Bennett, Josh Coleman and Billy Cumella, engineers; Greg Calbi and Steve Fallone, mastering engineers (Tony Bennett and Lady Gaga)
 Cinema
 Josh Conway, Marvin Figueroa, Josh Gudwin, Neal H Pogue and Ethan Shumaker, engineers; Joe LaPorta, mastering engineer (The Marías)
 Dawn
 Thomas Brenneck, Zach Brown, Elton "L10MixedIt" Chueng, Riccardo Damian, Tom Elmhirst, Jens Jungkurth, Todd Monfalcone, John Rooney and Smino, engineers; Randy Merrill, mastering engineer (Yebba)
 Hey What
 BJ Burton, engineer; BJ Burton, mastering engineer (Low)
 Notes with Attachments
 Joseph Lorge and Blake Mills, engineers; Greg Koller, mastering engineer (Pino Palladino and Blake Mills)

Producer of the Year, Non-Classical
 Jack Antonoff
 Chemtrails Over the Country Club (Lana Del Rey) (A) Daddy's Home (St. Vincent) (A) "Gold Rush" (Taylor Swift) (T) Sling (Clairo) (A) Solar Power (Lorde) (A) Take the Sadness Out of Saturday Night (Bleachers) (A) Rogét Chahayed
 "//Aguardiente y Limón %ᵕ‿‿ᵕ%" (Kali Uchis) (T)
 "Ain't S***" (Doja Cat) (T)
 "Beautiful" (Shelley FKA DRAM) (T)
 "Blueberry Eyes" (Max featuring Suga of BTS) (S)
 "Fire in the Sky" (Anderson .Paak) (T)
 "Kiss Me More" (Doja Cat featuring SZA) (S)
 "Lazy Susan" (21 Savage with Rich Brian featuring Warren Hue and MaSimWei) (S)
 "Nitrous" (Joji) (T)
 "Vibez" (Zayn) (S)
 Mike Elizondo
 Glow On (Turnstile) (A)
 "Good Day" (Twenty One Pilots) (T)
 Life by Misadventure (Rag'n'Bone Man) (A)
 "Mercy" (Jonas Brothers) (T)
 "Mulberry Street" (Twenty One Pilots) (T)
 Obviously (Lake Street Dive) (A)
 "Repeat" (Grace Vanderwaal) (S)
 "Taking The Heat" (Joy Oladokun) (T)
 Hit-Boy
 Judas and the Black Messiah: The Inspired Album (Various Artists) (A)
 King's Disease II (Nas) (A)
 Ricky Reed
 "//aguardiente y limón%ᵕ‿‿ᵕ%" (Kali Uchis) (T)
 "Can't Let You Go" (Terrace Martin featuring Nick Grant) (S)
 "Damn Bean" (John-Robert) (T)
 "Don't Go Yet" (Camila Cabello) (S)
 Gold-Diggers Sound (Leon Bridges) (A)
 "Piece of You" (Shawn Mendes) (T)
 "Pushing Away" (Junior Mesa) (T)
 "Rumors" (Lizzo featuring Cardi B) (S)
 "Sing" (Jon Batiste) (T)Best Remixed Recording, Non-Classical "Passenger" (Mike Shinoda remix)Mike Shinoda, remixer (Deftones) "Back to Life" (Booker T Kings of Soul satta dub)
Booker T., remixer (Soul II Soul)
 "Born for Greatness" (Cymek remix)
Spencer Bastin, remixer (Papa Roach)
 "Constant Craving" (Fashionably Late remix)
Tracy Young, remixer (k.d. lang)
 "Inside Out" (3scape Drm remix)
3scape Drm, remixer (Zedd and Griff)
 "Met Him Last Night" (Dave Audé remix)
Dave Audé, remixer (Demi Lovato featuring Ariana Grande)
 "Talks" (Mura Masa Remix)
Alexander Crossan, remixer (PVA)Best Immersive Audio Album Alicia
 George Massenburg and Eric Schilling, immersive mix engineers; Michael Romanowski, immersive mastering engineer; Ann Mincieli, immersive producer (Alicia Keys)
 Clique
 Jim Anderson and Ulrike Schwarz, immersive mix engineers; Bob Ludwig, immersive mastering engineer; Jim Anderson, immersive producer (Patricia Barber)
 Fine Line
 Greg Penny, immersive mix engineer; Greg Penny, immersive mastering engineer; Greg Penny, immersive producer (Harry Styles)
 The Future Bites
 Jake Fields and Steven Wilson, immersive mix engineers; Bob Ludwig, immersive mastering engineer; Steven Wilson, immersive producer (Steven Wilson)
 Stille Grender
 Morten Lindberg, immersive mix engineer; Morten Lindberg, immersive mastering engineer; Morten Lindberg, immersive producer (Anne Karin Sundal-Ask & Det Norske Jentekor)

Best Engineered Album, Classical
 Chanticleer Sings Christmas
 Leslie Ann Jones, engineer (Chanticleer)
 Archetypes
 Jonathan Lackey, Bill Maylone and Dan Nichols, engineers; Bill Maylone, mastering engineer (Sérgio Assad, Clarice Assad and Third Coast Percussion)
 Beethoven: Cello Sonatas - Hope Amid Tears
 Richard King, engineer (Yo-Yo Ma and Emanuel Ax)
 Beethoven: Symphony No. 9
 Mark Donahue, engineer; Mark Donahue, mastering engineer (Manfred Honeck, Mendelssohn Choir of Pittsburgh and Pittsburgh Symphony Orchestra)
 Mahler: Symphony No. 8, 'Symphony of a Thousand Alexander Lipay and Dmitriy Lipay, engineers; Alexander Lipay and Dmitriy Lipay, mastering engineers (Gustavo Dudamel, Fernando Malvar-Ruiz, Luke McEndarfer, Robert Istad, Grant Gershon, Los Angeles Children's Chorus, Los Angeles Master Chorale, National Children's Chorus, Pacific Chorale and Los Angeles Philharmonic)Producer of the Year, Classical Judith Sherman Alone Together (Jennifer Koh) (A) Bach & Beyond Part 3 (Jennifer Koh) (A) Bruits (Imani Winds) (A) Eryilmaz: Dances of the Yogurt Maker (Erberk Eryilmaz and Carpe Diem String Quartet) (A) Fantasy - Oppens Plays Kaminsky (Ursula Oppens) (A) Home (Blythe Gaissert) (A) Mendelssohn, Visconti and Golijov (Jasper String Quartet and Jupiter String Quartet) (A) A Schubert Journey (Llŷr Williams) (A) Vers Le Silence - William Bolcom & Frédéric Chopin (Ran Dank) (A) Blanton Alspaugh
 Appear And Inspire (James Franklin and the East Carolina University Chamber Singers) (A)
 Howells: Requiem (Brian Schmidt and Baylor University A Cappella Choir) (A)
 Hymns of Kassianí (Alexander Lingas and Cappella Romana) (A)
 Kyr: In Praise of Music (Joshua Copeland and Antioch Chamber Ensemble) (A)
 More Honourable Than the Cherubim (Vladimir Gorbik and PaTRAM Institute Male Choir) (A)
 O'Regan: The Phoenix (Patrick Summers, Thomas Hampson, Chad Shelton, Rihab Chaieb, Lauren Snouffer, Houston Grand Opera and Houston Grand Opera Orchestra) (A)
 Sheehan: Liturgy Of Saint John Chrysostom (Benedict Sheeha and the Saint Tikhon Choir) (A)
 Steven Epstein
 Bach And Brahms Re-Imagined (Jens Lindemann, James Ehnes and Jon Kimura Parker) (A)
 Bartók: Quartet No. 3; Beethoven: Op. 59, No. 2; Dvořák: American Quartet (Juilliard String Quartet) (A)
 Beethoven: Cello Sonatas - Hope Amid Tears (Yo-Yo Ma and Emanuel Ax) (A)
 Mozart: Piano Concertos Nos. 9 and 17, Arr. For Piano, String Quartet And Double Bass (Alon Goldstein, Alexander Bickard and Fine Arts Quartet) (A)
 Songs of Comfort and Hope (Yo-Yo Ma and Kathryn Stott) (A)
 David Frost
 Chamber Works By Dmitri Klebanov (ARC Ensemble) (A)
 Glass: Akhnaten (Karen Kamensek, J'Nai Bridges, Dísella Lárusdóttir, Zachary James, Anthony Roth Costanzo, Metropolitan Opera Chorus and Orchestra) (A)
 Mon Ami, Mon Amour (Matt Haimovitz and Mari Kodama) (A)
 One Movement Symphonies - Barber, Sibelius, Scriabin (Michael Stern and Kansas City Symphony) (A)
 Poulenc: Dialogues Des Carmélites (Yannick Nézet-Séguin, Isabel Leonard, Erin Morley, Adrianne Pieczonka, Karita Mattila, Karen Cargill, Metropolitan Opera Chorus and Orchestra) (A)
 Primavera I - The Wind (Matt Haimovitz) (A)
 Roots (Randall Goosby and Zhu Wang) (A)
 Elaine Martone
 Archetypes (Sérgio Assad, Clarice Assad and Third Coast Percussion) (A)
 Beneath the Sky (Zoe Allen and Levi Hernandez) (A)
 Davis: Family Secrets - Kith & Kin (Timothy Myers, Andrea Edith Moore and Jane Holding) (A)
 Quest (Elisabeth Remy Johnson) (A)
 Schubert: Symphony In C Major, 'The Great'; Krenek: Static & Ecstatic (Franz Welser-Möst and the Cleveland Orchestra) (A)

ClassicalBest Orchestral Performance "Price: Symphonies Nos. 1 & 3" Yannick Nézet-Séguin, conductor (Philadelphia Orchestra) "Adams: My Father Knew Charles Ives; Harmonielehre"
 Giancarlo Guerrero, conductor (Nashville Symphony Orchestra)
 "Beethoven: Symphony No. 9"
 Manfred Honeck, conductor (Mendelssohn Choir of Pittsburgh and Pittsburgh Symphony Orchestra)
 "Muhly: Throughline"
 Nico Muhly, conductor (San Francisco Symphony)
 "Strauss: Also Sprach Zarathustra; Scriabin: The Poem of Ecstasy"
 Thomas Dausgaard, conductor (Seattle Symphony Orchestra)Best Opera Recording "Glass: Akhnaten" Karen Kamensek, conductor; J’Nai Bridges, Anthony Roth Costanzo, Zachary James and Dísella Lárusdóttir; David Frost, producer (The Metropolitan Opera Orchestra; The Metropolitan Opera Chorus) "Bartók: Bluebeard's Castle"
 Susanna Mälkki, conductor; Mika Kares and Szilvia Vörös; Robert Suff, producer (Helsinki Philharmonic Orchestra)
 "Janáček: Cunning Little Vixen"
 Simon Rattle, conductor; Sophia Burgos, Lucy Crowe, Gerald Finley, Peter Hoare, Anna Lapkovskaja, Paulina Malefane, Jan Martinik and Hanno Müller-Brachmann; Andrew Cornall, producer (London Symphony Orchestra; London Symphony Chorus and LSO Discovery Voices)
 "Little: Soldier Songs"
 Corrado Rovaris, conductor; Johnathan McCullough; James Darrah and John Toia, producers (The Opera Philadelphia Orchestra)
 "Poulenc: Dialogues Des Carmélites"
 Yannick Nézet-Séguin, conductor; Karen Cargill, Isabel Leonard, Karita Mattila, Erin Morley and Adrianne Pieczonka; David Frost, producer (The Metropolitan Opera Orchestra; The Metropolitan Opera Chorus)Best Choral Performance "Mahler: Symphony No. 8, 'Symphony Of A Thousand'" Gustavo Dudamel, conductor; Grant Gershon, Robert Istad, Fernando Malvar-Ruiz and Luke McEndarfer, chorus masters (Leah Crocetto, Mihoko Fujimura, Ryan McKinny, Erin Morley, Tamara Mumford, Simon O'Neill, Morris Robinson and Tamara Wilson; Los Angeles Philharmonic; Los Angeles Children's Chorus, Los Angeles Master Chorale, National Children's Chorus and Pacific Chorale) "It's a Long Way"
 Matthew Guard, conductor (Jonas Budris, Carrie Cheron, Fiona Gillespie, Nathan Hodgson, Helen Karloski, Enrico Lagasca, Megan Roth, Alissa Ruth Suver and Dana Whiteside; Skylark Vocal Ensemble)
 "Rising w/The Crossing"
 Donald Nally, conductor (International Contemporary Ensemble and Quicksilver; The Crossing)
 "Schnittke: Choir Concerto; Three Sacred Hymns; Pärt: Seven Magnificat-Antiphons"
 Kaspars Putniņš, conductor; Heli Jürgenson, chorus master (Estonian Philharmonic Chamber Choir)
 "Sheehan: Liturgy of Saint John Chrysostom"
 Benedict Sheehan, conductor (Michael Hawes, Timothy Parsons and Jason Thoms; The Saint Tikhon Choir)
 "The Singing Guitar"
 Craig Hella Johnson, conductor (Estelí Gomez; Austin Guitar Quartet, Douglas Harvey, Los Angeles Guitar Quartet and Texas Guitar Quartet; Conspirare)Best Chamber Music/Small Ensemble Performance Beethoven: Cello Sonatas - Hope Amid Tears – Yo-Yo Ma and Emanuel Ax Adams, John Luther: Lines Made by Walking – JACK Quartet
 Akiho: Seven Pillars – Sandbox Percussion
 Archetypes – Sérgio Assad, Clarice Assad and Third Coast Percussion
 Bruits – Imani WindsBest Classical Instrumental Solo Alone Together – Jennifer Koh An American Mosaic – Simone Dinnerstein
 Bach: Sonatas & Partitas – Augustin Hadelich
 Beethoven & Brahms: Violin Concertos – Gil Shaham; Eric Jacobsen, conductor (The Knights)
 Mak Bach – Mak Grgić
 Of Power – Curtis StewartBest Classical Solo Vocal Album Mythologies Sangeeta Kaur, Hila Plitmann, and Danaë Xanthe Vlasse  (Virginie D'Avezac De Castera, Lili Haydn, Wouter Kellerman, Nadeem Majdalany, Eru Matsumoto and Emilio D. Miler) Confessions
 Laura Strickling; Joy Schreier, pianist
 Dreams Of A New Day - Songs By Black Composers
 Will Liverman; Paul Sánchez, pianist
 Schubert: Winterreise
 Joyce DiDonato; Yannick Nézet-Séguin, pianist
 Unexpected Shadows
 Jamie Barton; Jake Heggie, pianist (Matt Haimovitz)Best Classical Compendium Women Warriors - The Voices Of Change Amy Andersson, conductor; Amy Andersson, Mark Mattson and Lolita Ritmanis, producers American Originals - A New World, A New Canon
 AGAVE and Reginald L. Mobley; Geoffrey Silver, producer
 Berg: Violin Concerto; Seven Early Songs and Three Pieces for Orchestra
 Michael Tilson Thomas, conductor; Jack Vad, producer
 Cerrone: The Arching Path
 Timo Andres and Ian Rosenbaum; Mike Tierney, producer
 Plays
 Chick Corea; Chick Corea and Birnie Kirsh, producersBest Contemporary Classical Composition "Shaw: Narrow Sea" Caroline Shaw, composer (Dawn Upshaw, Gilbert Kalish and Sō Percussion) "Akiho: Seven Pillars"
 Andy Akiho, composer (Sandbox Percussion)
 "Andriessen: The Only One"
 Louis Andriessen, composer (Esa-Pekka Salonen, Nora Fischer and Los Angeles Philharmonic)
 "Assad, Clarice & Sérgio, Connors, Dillon, Martin & Skidmore: Archetypes"
 Clarice Assad, Sérgio Assad, Sean Connors, Robert Dillon, Peter Martin and David Skidmore, composers (Sérgio Assad, Clarice Assad and Third Coast Percussion)
 "Batiste: Movement 11'"
 Jon Batiste, composer (Jon Batiste)

Music Video/FilmBest Music Video "Freedom" – Jon Batiste Alan Ferguson, video director; Alex P. Willson, video producer "Shot in the Dark" – AC/DC
 David Mallet, video director; Dione Orrom, video producer
 "I Get a Kick Out of You" – Tony Bennett and Lady Gaga
 Jennifer Lebeau, video director; Danny Bennett, Bobby Campbell and Jennifer Lebeau, video producers
 "Peaches" – Justin Bieber featuring Daniel Caesar and Giveon
 Colin Tilley, video director; Jamee Ranta and Jack Winter, video producers
 "Happier Than Ever" – Billie Eilish
 Billie Eilish, video director; Michelle An, Chelsea Dodson and David Moore, video producers
 "Montero (Call Me by Your Name)" – Lil Nas X
 Lil Nas X and Tanu Muino, video directors; Frank Borin, Ivanna Borin, Marco De Molina and Saul Levitz, video producers
 "Good 4 U" – Olivia Rodrigo
 Petra Collins, video director; Christiana Divona, Marissa Ramirez and Tiffany Suh, video producersBest Music Film Summer of Soul – Various Artists Ahmir "Questlove" Thompson, video director; David Dinerstein, Robert Fyvolent and Joseph Patel, video producers'''
 Bo Burnham: Inside – Bo Burnham
 Bo Burnham, video director; Josh Senior, video producer
 David Byrne's American Utopia – David Byrne
 Spike Lee, video director; David Byrne and Spike Lee, video producers
 Happier Than Ever: A Love Letter to Los Angeles – Billie Eilish
 Patrick Osborne and Robert Rodriguez, video directors; Michelle An, Chelsea Dodson, Justin Lubliner and Juliet Tierney, video producers
 Music, Money, Madness... Jimi Hendrix in Maui – Jimi Hendrix
 John McDermott, video director; Janie Hendrix, John McDermott and George Scott, video producers

 Special Merit Awards 
 Lifetime Achievement Award 
 Bonnie Raitt

Multiple nominations and awards
The following received multiple nominations:Eleven:Jon BatisteEight:Justin Bieber
Doja Cat
H.E.R.Seven:Billie Eilish
Olivia RodrigoSix:D'Mile
GiveonFive:Lady Gaga
Tony Bennett
Daniel Caesar
Brandi Carlile
Finneas
Şerban Ghenea
Lil Baby
Lil Nas X
Randy Merrill
SZA
Kanye WestFour:Baby Keem
Chris Brown
Greg Calbi
Rogét Chahayed
J. Cole
Chick Corea
Steve Fallone
Carter Lang
Manny Marroquin
Maverick City Music
Chandler Moore
Silk Sonic
Tiara ThomasThree:AC/DC
Yeti Beats
Louis Bell
Dae Bennett
Dante Bowe
Dave Cobb
Josh Coleman
Dr. Luke
Elevation Worship
Tom Elmhirst
Omer Fedi
Foo Fighters
David Frost
Ariana Grande
Josh Gudwin
Mickey Guyton
Bernard "Harv" Harvey
Jay-Z
Angélique Kidjo
Dave Kutch
Roy Lenzo
Colin Leonard
Daniel Nigro
Allison Russell
Chris Stapleton
Jazmine Sullivan
Take a Daytrip
Ty Dolla Sign
Joe Visciano
Andrew Watt
The Weeknd
CeCe WinansTwo:Snoh Aalegra
Arooj Aftab
Jack Antonoff
Ólafur Arnalds
Rob Bisel
Black Pumas
Terence Blanchard
Benny Blanco
Bonobo
Mike Bozzi
Leon Bridges
Brothers Osborne
Brody Brown  
Burna Boy
Bo Burnham
Cardiak
Brandy Clark
Ant Clemons
Jacob Collier
Chris Cornell
Billy Cumella
DaBaby
Deftones
Russ Elevado
Jason Evigan
Béla Fleck
Steven Furtick
Chris Gehringer
Rhiannon Giddens
Jeff Gitelman
Robert Glasper
Ashley Gorley
Jack Harlow
Kuk Harrell
Cory Henry
Hit-Boy
Jennifer Hudson
Japanese Breakfast
Rodney "Darkchild" Jerkins
Tori Kelly
The Kid Laroi
Rob Kinelski
Felisha "Fury" King
Kizzo
Femi Kuti
Kendrick Lamar
Miranda Lambert
Matthew Sean Leon
Rian Lewis
Joseph Lorge
Lucky Daye
Yo-Yo Ma
Michelle Mancini
Luis Manuel Martinez Jr.
Mitch McCarthy
Paul McCartney
Steve McEwan
Maren Morris
PJ Morton
Kacey Musgraves
Nas
Nova Wav
Arturo O'Farrill
Arlo Parks
Gerard Powell II
Ricky Reed
Autumn Rowe
Christopher Ruelas
Jaclyn Sanchez
Saweetie
Shndo
Aaron Simmonds
Sturgill Simpson
Billy Strings
Megan Thee Stallion
Tizhimself
Francesco Turrisi
21 Savage
Tyler, the Creator
Carrie Underwood
Tauren Wells
Steven Wilson
WizKid
Mitch Wong
Keavan Yazdani
Yola
Young Thug

The following received multiple awards:Five:Jon BatisteFour:Silk SonicThree:D'Mile
Foo Fighters
Olivia Rodrigo
Chris Stapleton
CeCe WinansTwo:Brody Brown
Chick Corea
Jazmine Sullivan
Kanye West

Ukraine tribute
A tribute to victims of the 2022 Russian invasion of Ukraine was featured with a performance of "Go Down Moses". Prior to the performance, a short video of Volodymyr Zelenskyy concerning the circumstances of warfare and military activity in Ukraine was played. Zelenskyy's appearance was seen by some as a way to make up for the rejection of the similar idea during the 94th Academy Awards the week before.

In Memoriam
The In Memoriam segment was introduced by host Trevor Noah, with Cynthia Erivo, Ben Platt, Leslie Odom Jr., and Rachel Zegler performing multiple songs by American composer Stephen Sondheim during the segment, including "Somewhere" (from West Side Story), "Send in the Clowns" (from A Little Night Music), and "Not a Day Goes By" (from Merrily We Roll Along'').

Taylor Hawkins
Marilyn Bergman
Virgil Abloh
Gary Brooker
Walter Yetnikoff
Sarah Dash
Ken Kragen
Dottie Dodgion
Paddy Moloney
Jim Steinman
Biz Markie
Marília Mendonça
Clarence McDonald
Rusty Young
Connie Bradley
Stonewall Jackson
Roger Hawkins
Betty Davis
George Wein
Johnny Ventura
Lisa Roy
Charlie Watts
Wanda Young
Meat Loaf
Al Schlesinger
Lee "Scratch" Perry
Don Everly
Robbie Shakespeare
Michael Lang
Ronnie Spector
Ralph Emery
Young Dolph
Nanci Griffith
Jesse D
Mark Lanegan
Shock G
Vicente Fernández
Jeremy Lubbock
Tom Parker
Dusty Hill
Ethel Gabriel
Lloyd Price
Al Schmitt
Ron Tutt
Joe Simon
Malcolm Cecil
Jon Lind
Greg Tate
Elliot Mazer
Bobbie Nelson
B. J. Thomas
DMX
Dallas Frazier
Bhaskar Menon
Ronnie Wilson
Marshall Gelfand
Michael Nesmith
James Mtume
Tom T. Hall
Chucky Thompson
Stephen Sondheim

References

External links
 

 064
2022 music awards
2022 awards in the United States
2022 in American music
2022 in Nevada
2022 Russian invasion of Ukraine in popular culture
MGM Grand Garden Arena
April 2022 events in the United States
Impact of the COVID-19 pandemic on the music industry
Impact of the COVID-19 pandemic on television
Music events postponed due to the COVID-19 pandemic